Yahya ibn Ismail ibn Yahya, known by the regnal name al-Qadir bi-llah (died 28 October 1092) was the Dhulnunid ruler of the Taifa of Toledo in Spain between 1075 until the fall of Toledo in 1085 and of the Taifa of Valencia from 1086 until his death.

Biography
He succeeded his grandfather al-Mamun when he was assassinated in 1075. In 1079 Toledo revolted and the ruler of the Taifa of Badajoz, took the city. Al-Qadir fled and sought help from king Alfonso VI of León and Castile who came to his aid, enabling him to retake the city on 25 May 1085 as his vassal.

Al-Qadir also had designs on the Taifa of Valencia, although he had to counter the ambitions of the ruler of the Taifa of Zaragoza, Yusuf al-Mu'taman ibn Hud. Once again Alfonso VI sent troops, under the command of Álvar Fáñez to support him. In return, in 1086 Alfonso VI required his vassal to confront the Almoravids at the battle of Sagrajas. In 1092, a popular revolt instigated by the qadi Ibn Yahhaf with the support of a pro-Almoravid faction in the city deposed al-Qadir and executed him on 28 October of that year.

References

1092 deaths
Year of birth unknown

Taifa of Toledo
History of Valencia
11th-century rulers in Al-Andalus